Baron Ashbourne, of Ashbourne in the County of Meath, is a title in the Peerage of the United Kingdom. It was created in 1886 for Edward Gibson, the Lord Chancellor of Ireland. His grandson, the third Baron (who succeeded his uncle), was a vice admiral in the Royal Navy.  the title is held by the third Baron's grandson, the fifth Baron, who succeeded in 2020.

John George Gibson, younger brother of the first Baron, was also a distinguished lawyer. Violet Gibson, who attempted to assassinate Benito Mussolini in 1926, was the first Baron's daughter.

Barons Ashbourne (1886)
Edward Gibson, 1st Baron Ashbourne (1837–1913)
William Gibson, 2nd Baron Ashbourne (1868–1942)
Edward Russell Gibson, 3rd Baron Ashbourne (1901–1983)
Edward Barry Greynville Gibson, 4th Baron Ashbourne (1933–2020)
Edward Charles d'Olier Gibson, 5th Baron Ashbourne (born 1967)

The heir apparent is the present holder's son, Edward Alexander Gibson (born 2002)

Arms

References

 

Baronies in the Peerage of the United Kingdom
Noble titles created in 1885
Noble titles created for UK MPs